Omphalosauridae is an extinct family of Ichthyopterygians known from the Early to Late Triassic of Europe, North America, and Asia.

References

Middle Triassic ichthyosaurs
Late Triassic ichthyosaurs
Prehistoric reptile families